Erison Danilo de Souza (born 13 April 1999), simply known as Erison, is a Brazilian footballer who plays as a forward for São Paulo, on loan from Botafogo.

Club career
Erison was born in Cosmópolis, São Paulo, and joined XV de Piracicaba's youth setup at the age of 18, after playing amateur tournaments. He made his first team debut on 26 January 2019, coming on as a late substitute in a 0–0 Campeonato Paulista Série A2 home draw against Nacional-SP.

On 30 October 2020, after being a regular starter for XV, Erison was loaned to Série B side Figueirense until the end of the season. After suffering relegation, he returned to his parent club in February 2021.

On 18 August 2021, Erison joined Brasil de Pelotas also in the second division, on a loan deal until December. Despite only playing 19 matches for the side, he ended the campaign as the club's top scorer with eight goals, but was unable to prevent team relegation.

On 21 January 2022, Erison moved to Botafogo on a two-year contract. On 30 August, he was loaned to Primeira Liga side Estoril, for one year.

On 1 February 2023, Erison returned to his home country, after being announced at São Paulo.

Career statistics

References

External links
 Botafogo profile 

1999 births
Living people
Footballers from São Paulo (state)
Brazilian footballers
Association football forwards
Campeonato Brasileiro Série A players
Campeonato Brasileiro Série B players
Primeira Liga players
Esporte Clube XV de Novembro (Piracicaba) players
Figueirense FC players
Grêmio Esportivo Brasil players
Botafogo de Futebol e Regatas players
G.D. Estoril Praia players
São Paulo FC players
Brazilian expatriate footballers
Brazilian expatriate sportspeople in Portugal
Expatriate footballers in Portugal